Mount Simpson is a peak of the Walker Mountains, rising just west of the head of Hale Glacier on Thurston Island in Antarctica. It was first mapped from air photos taken by U.S. Navy Operation Highjump in December 1946. It was named by the Advisory Committee on Antarctic Names (US-ACAN) for Lieutenant B.L. Simpson, Jr., of U.S. Navy Squadron VX-6, a pilot of the P2V Neptune airplane which took additional air photos of the area in January 1960.

Maps
 Thurston Island – Jones Mountains. 1:500000 Antarctica Sketch Map. US Geological Survey, 1967.
 Antarctic Digital Database (ADD). Scale 1:250000 topographic map of Antarctica. Scientific Committee on Antarctic Research (SCAR). Since 1993, regularly upgraded and updated.

Mountains of Ellsworth Land